Escape from the 'Liberty' Cinema is a 1990 Polish drama film directed by Wojciech Marczewski. It was screened in the Un Certain Regard section at the 1991 Cannes Film Festival.

Cast
 Janusz Gajos - The Censor
 Zbigniew Zamachowski - Deputy Censor
 Teresa Marczewska - Malgorzata
 Władysław Kowalski - Professor
 Piotr Fronczewski - Party Secretary
 Jerzy Bińczycki - Cinema Manager
 Michał Bajor - Film Critic
 Krzysztof Wakulinski - Malgorzata's Husband
 Artur Barciś - Projectionist
 Ewa Wiśniewska - Censor's Ex-Wife
 Monika Bolly - Censor's Daughter
 Maciej Kozłowski - American Actor
 Jan Peszek - Character Cut from Film
 Aleksander Bednarz - Edward

References

External links

1990 films
1990s Polish-language films
1990 drama films
Films directed by Wojciech Marczewski
Polish drama films